Denise Herrmann-Wick (née Herrmann, born 20 December 1988) is a former German biathlete and cross-country skier. She won gold at 2022 Winter Olympics – Women's individual, won gold at Biathlon World Championships 2019 – Women's pursuit and won gold at Biathlon World Championships 2023 – Women's sprint. Previously, she has competed in FIS Cross-Country World Cup since 2009. Herrmann has won several medals at the World Cup events. In April 2016, she announced that she would switch to competing in biathlon for the following season, although in an interview in November of that year, she did not rule out competing in cross-country skiing in the future.

On 14 March 2023, she announced her retirement following the 2022–2023 season.

Cross-country skiing results

All results are sourced from the International Ski Federation (FIS).

Olympic Games
 1 medal – (1 bronze)

World Championships

World Cup

Season standings

Individual podiums
 6 podiums – (3 , 3 )

World Cup team podiums
 2 podiums – (2 )

Biathlon results
All results are sourced from the International Biathlon Union.

Olympic Games
2 medals (1 gold, 1 bronze)

World Championships
9 medals (2 gold, 6 silver, 1 bronze)

*During Olympic seasons competitions are only held for those events not included in the Olympic program.
**The single mixed relay was added as an event in 2019.

World Cup

Individual victories
 13 victories (7 Sp, 4 Pu, 2 In)
 22 podiums (7 Sp, 8 Pu, 5 In, 2 Ms)

Relay victories

References

External links

1988 births
Living people
People from Erzgebirgskreis
German female cross-country skiers
German female biathletes
Tour de Ski skiers
Cross-country skiers at the 2014 Winter Olympics
Olympic cross-country skiers of Germany
Medalists at the 2014 Winter Olympics
Medalists at the 2022 Winter Olympics
Olympic medalists in biathlon
Olympic medalists in cross-country skiing
Biathletes at the 2018 Winter Olympics
Biathletes at the 2022 Winter Olympics
Olympic biathletes of Germany
Olympic gold medalists for Germany
Olympic bronze medalists for Germany
Biathlon World Championships medalists
Doping cases in cross-country skiing
German sportspeople in doping cases
Sportspeople from Saxony
21st-century German women